When In-N-Out Burger first opened in 1948, the company only provided a basic menu of burgers, fries and beverages. The foods it prepared were made on-site from fresh ingredients, including its french fries which were sliced and cooked to order. Unlike other major competitors in the hamburger fast food restaurant business (Burger King, McDonald's and Wendy's), as the chain has expanded over the years, it has not added products such as chicken or salads to its menu since 1976 and has never changed its preparation methods.

The company utilizes a vertical integration model for its raw ingredients, procuring and manufacturing much of its food supplies in-house. The company does not utilize freezers in its operations, shipping food daily to its stores from its facilities. Instead of a broad menu like other competitors, In-N-Out has become known for its "secret menu", or unadvertised variations of its burgers that are based on customer preferences, such as the popular "Animal Style".

Burgers 

All burgers consist of one or more  beef patties cooked to "medium-well", and served on a toasted bun. The standard style of burger includes tomato,  hand-leafed lettuce and "spread", a sauce similar to Thousand Island dressing.

Meat 
For most of its history, In-N-Out has produced its own meat in company-owned facilities. The chain has a policy of using only fresh meat, and all of its stores are supplied by its California manufacturing operations located in Baldwin Park. With its expansion into Texas, the restaurant opened its first production plant outside of California in a suburb of Dallas in order to increase its geographic footprint. By keeping the manufacturing process in house, the chain is able to maintain strict quality control standards. 

Beginning in March 2016 the company announced that it would move forward to sourcing its beef from cows that have not been treated with antibiotics. The chain did not announce a timeframe for the switch, but that it would move forward at an expedited pace. Part of the reason for the switch was that California passed a series of laws to ban the use of antibiotics in non-medical, prophylactic treatments. Additionally, several groups of consumer advocacy NGOs, led by CalPIRG, had been pressuring a number of restaurant chains to stop using meat raised with low-dose antibiotics.

Secret menu variations 
The bulk of the secret menu revolves around the burgers. In-N-Out's own website acknowledges the existence of this secret menu, publicizing "some of the most popular items" on what it calls the company's "not-so-secret menu."

"Animal Style" is one of the most popular "secret" styles; in addition to the standard toppings, Animal Style burgers include mustard fried onto each meat patty, pickles, grilled onions, and extra spread.
"3×3" (pronounced 3-by-3), "4×4", or variations of "m" × "c", refers to a burger with a varied amount of meat patties, "m", and slices of cheese, "c": e.g. a burger with six meat patties and three slices of cheese is a "6×3". The In-N-Out "secret menu" section of the website only mentions the "3×3" and "4×4", which are registered trademarks of the company.

Until 2004, In-N-Out accommodated burger orders of any size by adding patties and slices of cheese at an additional cost.  However, on October 31, 2004, a group of friends ordered a 100×100 from a location in Las Vegas, Nevada, posting photos on the web of the burger with Tony Hsieh, CEO of Zappos. Once word got out of the incredibly large sandwich, In-N-Out management disallowed any sandwich larger than a 4x4.

In-N-Out has two low carbohydrate offerings. "Protein Style", introduced in the 1970s, replaces the bun with large leaves of lettuce; while the "Flying Dutchman" is a 2×2 with no bun, no vegetables, and no spread with the cheese slices placed between both patties. Health.com rated the protein-style sandwich as the best low-carb sandwich in the United States. They also offer a grilled cheese sandwich (a hamburger with the patty replaced by two slices of cheese).

Onion styles 
In-N-Out's burger customization offers customers a choice of six different onion styles – three variations of the two ways that onions can be cut (sliced versus chopped).

With onion or chopped onion – standard placement, onion is put on top of the meat/cheese as the burger is cooking.
Raw onion or raw chopped onion – onion is cold and more crisp, placed on top of the spread.
Whole grilled onion or grilled onion – onions are grilled until brown, placed on top of meat.

French fries 

In-N-Out uses the Kennebec variety of potato for its fries and prepares them on-site as opposed to purchasing them pre-made from other companies. The company's french fries are cooked in "100% pure, cholesterol-free sunflower oil." Fries can also be cooked to order, with cooking times ranging from "light" to "extra well done".

Beverages 
The company offers lemonade, unsweetened iced tea (though sweet tea is available at Texas stores only), coffee, three flavors of milk shakes (chocolate, vanilla, and strawberry) which can be mixed in any combination desired, and soda. In-N-Out serves soda from two different companies.  It serves Coca-Cola Classic, Diet Coke, and Barq's Famous Olde Tyme Root Beer from The Coca-Cola Company, and 7 Up and Dr Pepper from the Dr Pepper Snapple Group. The company advertises that its milkshakes are made with "100% real ice cream."

Notes

References

Further reading 

Products by individual company